Pandua is a census town in the Pandua CD block in the Chinsurah subdivision of the Hooghly district in the Indian state of West Bengal.

Geography

Location
It has an average elevation of 19 metres (62 feet).

Pandua, Purusattompur and Namajgram form a cluster of census towns.

Pandua CD block is a flat alluvial plain, known as the Hooghly-Damodar Plain, that forms part of the Gangetic Delta.

The place is best known for its minar and the ruins of Pandu Raja's Palace where all important state ceremonies were held. The  13th century minar soars to a height of 125 feet.

History
According to Binoy Ghosh, the tall Pandua minar can be seen by those travelling in trains or along the Grand Trunk Road. It is locally said that Shah Sufiuddin defeated the Hindu king of the Pandua and Mahanad area and built this victory pillar. Mahiuddin Ostagar of Santipur composed a poem, Panduar Kechha, in which he describes how Muslim domination of the area was achieved.  There was a king named Pandu in Pandua. Inside his palace there was a well blessed by the gods. When the body of a dead person was immersed in its waters, the person regained life. During the reign of king Pandu, mostly Hindus lived in Pandua, and there were a few Muslims. One day a Muslim peasant  killed a cow on his son’s birthday. This enraged the Hindus and they killed the son. The Muslim peasant complained to king Pandu but he did not take any action. The peasant carried the dead body of his son to the Badshah at Delhi, Feroze Shah. After listening to the complaint, he sent his nephew, Shah Sufi, at the head of an army, to Pandua. He waged war but initially he was unsuccessful, because of the life-giving properties of the divine well. Frustrated Shah Sufi was almost on the verge of returning to Delhi, when a cowherd boy revealed the secret of the divine well to Shah Sufi. The boy, dressed as a yogi, entered the  palace and threw some beef into the well, thereby destroying its divine properties. The Muslim forces captured Pandua, and Shah Sufi remained back in Pandua. He built a large mosque there.

Historically, there is no evidence of the existence of king Pandu, but there were many minor Hindu kings in the Saptagram-Pandua area. Within a century of Bakhtiyar Khilji’s conquest, the Muslim thrust into the southern parts of the Rarh region, that included present-day Hooghy district, started from the end of the 13th century to the 14th century. It was during the rule of the Balban sultans in Delhi (1286-1328) that the efforts were made to establish Islam, not only by capturing the thrones and political power, but also establish Islam socially. Their modus operandi was “to enter the territory of the Hindu rajas as squatters on some pretext or other. Then they would bring down the regular army of the Muslim State upon these infidel kings to punish them for infringing the rights of Mussalmans.”

According to the available records, Zafar Khan had come to the Tribeni area towards the end of the 13th century and Shah Sufiuddin had come to the Pandua area towards the beginning of the 14th century. During the period that followed Muslim Ghazis built many mosques and tombs on the ruins of Hindu temples. There is tell-tale evidence of the historical role of Muslim Ghazi-Pirs in the Pandua-Mahanad-Tribeni area.

The Srinkhala Devi Shrine as a Shakti Peeth
The mythology of Daksha yajna and Sati's self immolation had immense significance in shaping the ancient Sanskrit literature and even had impact on the culture of India. It led  to the development of the concept of Shakti Peethas and there by strengthening Shaktism. Enormous mythological stories in puranas took the Daksha yaga as the reason for its origin. 

The Shaktipitha in Pradyumna is referred to in the Ashtadasha Shakti Pitha stotra composed by Adi Shankaracharya as the pitha of the Goddess Srinkhala Devi,which has currently been destroyed.

Demographics
According to the 2011 Census of India, Pandua had a total population of 30,700 of which 15,597 (51%) were males and 15,103 (49%) were females. Population in the age range 0–6 years was 2,986. The total number of literate persons in Pandua was 22,604 (81.56% of the population over 6 years).

 India census, Pandua had a population of 27,126. Males constitute 51% of the population and females 49%. Pandua has an average literacy rate of 67%, higher than the national average of 59.5%: male literacy is 72%, and female literacy is 62%. In Pandua, 12% of the population is under 6 years of age.

Civic administration

Police station
Pandua police station has jurisdiction over Pandua CD block.

CD block HQ
The headquarters of Pandua CD block are located at Pandua.

Economy
This is a rich agricultural area with several cold storages.

S.R.Industry, manufacturer of construction and agricultural machinery was established at Pandua in 1996.

Transport
State Highway 13/ GT Road passes through Pandua.

Pundooah railway station situated on Howrah-Bardhaman main line.

Healthcare
Pandua has a rural hospital (with 30 beds).

Visitor attractions 
Bari Masjid: The meaning of the bari is "the big mosque which shows the incredible architecture styled with Bricks". It was built by Shah Sufiuddin in 14th century.
Pandua Minar: It was built by Shamsuddin Yusuf Shah in 1477 AD and it is a symbol of victory. Along with the Bari Masjid, it was built to replace the Srinkhala Devi temple which was destroyed by Shamsuddin Yusuf Shah.

Pandua picture gallery

Pandua minar
Monument of National Importance

Pandua mosque
Monument of National Importance

The other Pandua

References

External links

Pandua Image gallery
Travel article on Pandua by Rangan Datta
Rangan Datta's Home Page
Shrinkhala Shaktipith at Pandua

Cities and towns in Hooghly district